Dornhorst is a surname. Notable people with the surname include:

Frederick Dornhorst, Ceylonese (Sri Lankan) barrister and King's Advocate
Tony Dornhorst (1915–2003), British physician and medical educator